Banaaney is a town in the southeastern Gedo region of Somalia.

References
Banaaney

Populated places in Gedo